"Underdog" is a song by American singer-songwriter Alicia Keys. It was written by Keys, Johnny McDaid, Ed Sheeran, Amy Wadge, Jonny Coffer and Foy Vance, and produced by Keys and McDaid for her seventh studio album Alicia (2020). Released on January 9, 2020, as the album's third single, "Underdog" became a top 40 hit in many countries and was certified Platinum by the Recording Industry Association of America, indicating 1,000,000 units recorded in the US.

Background and release
"Underdog" was recorded for Keys' seventh studio album Alicia (2020). Speaking on the meaning behind the song, she told Rolling Stone:

"Underdog" was released on January 9, 2020, as the third single from Alicia. Meg Bishop from Minnesota Daily wrote that on the song, Keys "implores listeners to view people in their true context, below the surface of one glance". The single was featured in a TV ad for Amazon Music. On March 27, 2020, the song was remixed by Keys and featured reggae singers Protoje and Chronixx. On May 14, 2021, 16 months after the song's original release date, another remix of the song was released featuring American singer Nicky Jam and Puerto Rican singer Rauw Alejandro. In November 2021, Keys released a lullaby version of the song on Sweet Dreams extended play.

Critical reception 
Reviewing for NME, Nick Levine called "Underdog" a "slick pop-R&B single" with "unpretentious and affecting" lyrics. USA Todays Gary Dinges named it among the songs from Alicia that "take on new meaning when you listen to them within the scope of the pandemic and social strife plaguing the country". Adi Mehta from Entertainment Voice wrote that the song's "main melody is hopelessly trite" but "Keys manages to sound so sleek and modest". Konstantinos Pappis from Our Culture Mag wrote that the “uplifting” song is “anchored by Keys’ ability to sell everyday stories about perseverance” and named it one of the album’s highlights.

Live performances
Keys performed "Underdog" with Brittany Howard backing the performance on acoustic guitar at the 62nd Annual Grammy Awards and on The Ellen DeGeneres Show on January 29, 2020. Keys performed "Underdog" at BBC Radio 1 Live Lounge on February 6, 2020. Keys performed the song at a concert to promote the Alicia album held at Bush Hall in London as well as on The Graham Norton Show on February 7, 2020. In March, Keys performed an acoustic rendition of the song in iHeart Living Room Concert for America on the 29th and in #KidsTogether: The Nickelodeon Town Hall on the 30th. 

Keys performed "Underdog" at fundraising concert From Milan with Love on May 3, at a Salesforce virtual event Leading Through Change on May 21, and Front Row From Home on radio station 106.1 BLI on May 28, 2020. Keys performed the song on Super Soul Sunday on March 29, 2020. On June 7, 2020, Keys performed the song on Dear Class of 2020. In June 2020, Keys performed the song on NPR's Tiny Desk Concerts. Keys performed the song during her Verzuz battle with John Legend on June 19, 2020. Keys performed the song on The Late Late Show with James Corden on September 25, 2020. Keys performed the song during the Alicia Keys Rocks New Year's Eve concert on BBC One on December 31, 2020. The song is performed as part of Alicia + Keys World Tour.

Music video
A corresponding music video directed by Wendy Morgan was released the same day. Thematizing the idea of overcoming challenging situations, the video captures ordinary people hustling to improve their circumstances and is intercut with a dynamic performance from Keys.

Commercial performance
On February 7, 2020, "Underdog" debuted on the Billboard Hot 100 at position 93, making it the second single from Alicia to chart on the Hot 100. "Underdog" later peaked at number 69.

Track listings
Digital download
"Underdog" – 3:24

Digital download
"Underdog" (Acoustic Version) – 3:30

Digital download
"Underdog" (Remix) (featuring Chronixx and Protoje) – 2:59

Digital download
"Underdog" (Nicky Jam & Rauw Alejandro Remix) (featuring Nicky Jam & Rauw Alejandro) – 3:25

Charts

Weekly charts

Year-end charts

Certifications

References

2020 singles
2020 songs
Alicia Keys songs
RCA Records singles
Songs written by Alicia Keys
Songs written by Amy Wadge
Songs written by Ed Sheeran
Songs written by Jonny Coffer
Songs written by Foy Vance
Songs written by Johnny McDaid